Huatabampo Municipality is a municipality in Sonora in north-western Mexico. As of 2015, the municipality had a total population of 80,524.

The area of the municipality (urban and rural) is 1,169.92 km2.

References

Municipalities of Sonora